Sami Lepistö (born 17 October 1984) is a Finnish professional ice hockey defenceman who currently plays for SCL Tigers of the National League (NL). He is the son of former Jokerit captain and youth international defenceman Jussi Lepistö. Sami was drafted by the Washington Capitals in the third round, 66th overall, in the 2004 NHL Entry Draft.

Playing career

Jokerit
Lepistö played professional hockey for Jokerit in the Finnish SM-liiga. In 2003–04, his first season, Lepistö had 3 goals and 7 points in 53 games, followed by one assist in eight playoff games for Jokerit. He also played for Finland in the 2004 World Junior Ice Hockey Championships, scoring four goals and eight points in seven games. Lepistö saw his offensive numbers rise in 2004–05, as he had 7 goals and 25 points in 55 games. Lepistö also had a solid playoff performance for Jokerit, scoring 1 goal and 8 points in 12 games.

Lepistö returned to Jokerit in 2005–06 and increased his offensive numbers once again, scoring 8 goals and 29 points in 56 games. However, he had an injury plagued 2006–07 season, as he had 1 goal and 10 points in 26 games. On 31 May 2007, Lepistö signed a two-year, entry-level contract with the Washington Capitals.

NHL
Lepistö was sent to the Hershey Bears of the American Hockey League (AHL) in 2007–08, where in 55 games, he scored 4 goals and 45 points as well as posting a solid +29 rating. Lepistö also made his NHL debut on 16 February 2008 with the Capitals. In seven games with Washington in 2007–08, he had one assist. He was returned to Hershey, where he had an assist in five playoff games. After the season, Lepistö played for Finland at the 2008 IIHF World Championship, where he had one goal and one assist in seven games.

Lepistö spent most of the 2008–09 season with Hershey once again, scoring 4 goals and 42 points in 70 games and recording a +24 rating. He once again appeared in seven games with the Capitals, where Lepistö earned four assists. On 27 June 2009, Lepistö was traded to the Phoenix Coyotes for the Coyotes' fifth-round pick in the 2010 NHL Entry Draft.

Lepistö spent the entire 2009–10 season with the Phoenix Coyotes, where he scored 1 goal and 11 points in 66 games, helping the club to the 2010 playoffs. In seven playoff games with the Coyotes, Lepistö scored one goal. He also played for Finland at the 2010 Winter Olympics, where he recorded one assist in six games. He returned to the Coyotes for the 2010–11 season, where he had 4 goals and 11 points in 51 games.

On 28 February 2011, the Coyotes traded Lepistö and Scottie Upshall to the Columbus Blue Jackets in exchange for Rostislav Klesla and Dane Byers. On 15 July 2011, Lepistö signed a one-year contract with the Chicago Blackhawks.

KHL
On 4 June 2012, it was announced Lepistö had signed a one-year contract to play for the rebuilding Lokomotiv Yaroslavl of the Kontinental Hockey League (KHL).

On 12 January 2013, Lepistö was traded to Lev Prague of the KHL. In the summer of 2013, he signed a two-year contract with Avtomobilist Yekaterinburg. After that, he signed a one-year contract with Salavat Yulaev Ufa. During the 2016 playoffs, he tied Nikita Zaitsev and Chris Lee to lead all defenceman in playoff scoring with 13 points.

After two seasons with Ufa, it was announced Lepistö as a free agent would return to play for original club Jokerit, now competing in the KHL on 22 May 2017.

Career statistics

Regular season and playoffs

International

Awards and honours

References

External links

1984 births
Living people
Avtomobilist Yekaterinburg players
Chicago Blackhawks players
Columbus Blue Jackets players
Sportspeople from Espoo
Finnish ice hockey defencemen
Hershey Bears players
Ice hockey players at the 2010 Winter Olympics
Ice hockey players at the 2014 Winter Olympics
Jokerit players
HC Lev Praha players
Lokomotiv Yaroslavl players
Luleå HF players
Medalists at the 2010 Winter Olympics
Medalists at the 2014 Winter Olympics
Olympic bronze medalists for Finland
Olympic ice hockey players of Finland
Olympic medalists in ice hockey
Phoenix Coyotes players
Salavat Yulaev Ufa players
SCL Tigers players
Washington Capitals draft picks
Washington Capitals players
Ice hockey players at the 2018 Winter Olympics
Finnish expatriate ice hockey players in the United States
Finnish expatriate ice hockey players in Sweden
Finnish expatriate ice hockey players in Russia
Finnish expatriate ice hockey players in the Czech Republic
Finnish expatriate ice hockey players in Switzerland